Peth Vadgaon is a city and education hub in Kolhapur district in the Indian state of Maharashtra. It is governed by a municipal council.

Demographics
 India census, Vadgaon Kasba had a population of 22,754. Males constitute 52% of the population and females 48%. Vadgaon Kasba has an average literacy rate of 73%, higher than the national average of 59.5%: male literacy is 78%, and female literacy is 67%. In Vadgaon Kasba, 12% of the population is under 6 years of age. Current population of Peth Vadgaon is above 30,000 as in 2020.

History
Dhanaji Shambhusinha Jadhav (1650–1708), popularly known as Dhanaji Jadhav, was a warrior of the Maratha Empire. Along with Santaji Ghorpade he made terrifying campaigns against Mughal Army from 1689 to 1696. After Santaji, Dhanaji became the chief of the Maratha army in 1696 and remained on the post until his death in 1708. A monument of him stands in the town. Shri Sadguru Jivanmukt Swami Sanjiwan Samadhi math Bhajani galli: It is the oldest samadhi in Peth Vadgaon city. The math was established in 1826. It is one of the first namadev shimpi math. There is lake "Mahalaksmi Talav" near Mahalaxmi temple which is constructed by Shahu Maharaj. It is finely engineered to provide water for people in town. In city, there are 4 water tanks, which get filled automatically without any pumps or any other mechanism. Only by using gravity they achieved this feet.

Educational institutes

Educational institutes in Pethvadgaon include: 
 Vadgaon High School & Junior College, Peth Vadgaon
 Dr. Babasaheb Ambedkar College
 Shri Vijaysinh Yadav Arts & Science College
 Shri Balasaheb Mane Shikshan Prasarak Mandal's Group of Institution, Faculty of Management Studies, Vathar Tarfe Vadgaon
 Shri Balasaheb Mane Shikshan Prasarak Mandal,B.Ed. College
 Savitribai Phule Mahila Shikshanshastra Mahavidyalaya
 Holy Mother English Medium School
 Balasaheb Mane Shikshan Prasarak Mandal's Group of Institutions, Faculty of Engg., Wathar Tarfe Vadgaon
 Ashokrao Mane College of Pharmacy
 Ashokrao Mane Polytechnic, Vathar Tarf Vadgaon
 Shrimati Indira Gandhi Madhyamik Vidyalaya
 Smt. Sushiladevi Malharrao Desai Kanya Mahavidyalaya

Tourist attractions
 Dhanaji Jadhav Monument
 Mahalaxmi talav and mandir
 Ganesh mandir
 Mahadev mandir
 Nagnath mandir
 Shri Jewheshwar mandir (Swakul Sali Samaj)
 Shri Jivanmukta swami sanjiwan samadhi, bhajani galli ESTD:1660]] samadhi
  Historical Temple of Mahalaxmi (Kuranatil)
  Historical Mahalaxmi Lake (Build by Chatrapati Shahu Maharaj
 Nagaoba Wadi Temple
 Maa Saheb Sawari Masoodi Pir Temple 

Tourisam Near Peth Vadgaon
 Gandharv Farms & Resorts near Chinmay Ganesh
 Chinmay Ganesh Statue (82 ft tall Statue)
 Bahuballi (Jain Temple and Statue)
 Dhuloba Mandir
 Ramling Mandir 
 Allamprabhu Mandir
 Mahalaxmi Temple (Kolhapur) (Approx. 23 km from Vadgaon)

References
 

Cities and towns in Kolhapur district